The National Sports Awards is the collective name given to the six sports awards of Republic of India. It is awarded annually by the Ministry of Youth Affairs and Sports. They are presented by the President of India in the same ceremony at the Rashtrapati Bhavan usually on 29th August each year along with the national adventure award. , a total of sixty-eight individuals have been awarded the various National Sports Awards in boxing. The four awards presented in boxing are Rajiv Gandhi Khel Ratna, Arjuna Award, Dhyan Chand Award and Dronacharya Award.

First presented in the year 1961, a total of forty-five individuals have been honoured with the Arjuna Award in boxing for their "good performance at the international level" over the period of last four years. First presented in the year 1985, a total of eighteen coaches have been honoured with the Dronacharya Award in boxing for their "outstanding work on a consistent basis and enabling sportspersons to excel in international events" over the period of last four years, with four coaches being awarded in the lifetime contribution category. First presented in the year 2009, a total of two sportspersons have been honoured with the Rajiv Gandhi Khel Ratna, the highest sporting honour of India, in boxing for their "most outstanding performance at the international level" over the period of last four years. First presented in the year 2002, a total of three retired sportspersons have been honoured with the Dhyan Chand Award, the lifetime achievement sporting honour of India, in boxing for their "good performance at the international level and their continued contributions to the promotion of sports even after their career as a sportsperson is over." One awardee Hawa Singh was honoured Dronacharya Award posthumously in the year 1999.

Recipients

Reference

External links
Official Website

Indian sports trophies and awards
Ministry of Youth Affairs and Sports